The Goodie Mob Presents: Livin' Life as Lumberjacks is the only studio album by American hip hop duo the Lumberjacks, composed of Goodie Mob members Khujo and T-Mo. It was released on January 25, 2005 via Koch Records. Production was handled by Organized Noize, Darin "Superpower" Baker, Hall Of Tunez, Edward Cleveland, Cool Rah, Ed X, Khujo, Montez Harris, DJ Speedy. It features guest appearances from Witchdoctor, Big Gipp, Big Hustle and Preacher.

After Cee-Lo and Big Gipp decided to leave Goodie Mob, T-Mo and Khujo released this album. Despite leaving Goodie Mob, Big Gipp is featured on two tracks. This album also marks the tenth anniversary of when the entire Goodie Mob released their first album Soul Food in 1995.

Track listing

References

External links
The Lumberjacks – Livin' Life As Lumberjacks at Discogs

2005 debut albums
Goodie Mob albums
MNRK Music Group albums
Albums produced by Organized Noize